Chongwenmen Station is an interchange station on Line 2 and Line 5 of the Beijing Subway at Chongwenmen in Dongcheng District.

Bus stops
Chongwenmen West: 8, 9, 20, 41, 44, 59, 60 103, 104, 110, 203, 209, 211, 673, 723, 729.
Chongwenmennei: 25, 39, 41, 106, 108, 110, 111, 116, 684, 685
Chongwenmenwai: 108, 111
Chongwenmen East: 12, 25, 39, 43, 44, 525, 610

Station Layout 
Both the line 2 and 5 stations have underground island platforms.

Exits 
There are ten exits, lettered A1, A2, B1, B2, C, D, E, F, G, and H. Exits B1, E, and F are accessible.

References

External links

Railway stations in China opened in 1971
Beijing Subway stations in Dongcheng District